South Carolina Highway 81 (SC 81) is a  state highway in the U.S. state of South Carolina. The highway connects rural areas of McCormick County with Greenville, via Calhoun Falls, Iva, Homeland Park, and Anderson.

Route description
SC 81 begins at an intersection with SC 28 east-southeast of Lethia within McCormick County. This intersection is within Sumter National Forest and just north of SC 28's crossing of Long Cane Creek. It travels to the northwest and curves to the west-southwest and travels through Lethia. It then curves to the southwest, passes just to the west of the John de la Howe School, and crosses the Little River. The highway then curves to the northwest. It travels through Willington, where it curves to the west-northwest. Just before Turman road, it leaves the national forest proper and begins traveling along the western edge of it. SC 81 curves to the north-northwest and enters Mount Carmel. There, it crosses over Bell Creek and then intersects SC 823, which is east of Mount Carmel Cemetery. It immediately curves to the northwest and leaves the forest. At Ike Road, SC 81 leaves Mount Carmel proper and travels along the edge of it until it intersects McCallister Chapel Road. A short distance later, it enters Abbeville County.

SC 81 enters Calhoun Falls and curves to the north. It intersects SC 72 (Russell Lake Boulevard). It passes Calhoun Falls Charter School and Edgewood Park. Upon leaving town, it passes Calhoun Falls State Park and then Salem Cemetery and curves to the north-northwest. It intersects the western terminus of SC 284 (Mitchel Place Road). It curves to the northwest and has an intersection with the western terminus of SC 71. It travels to the west-southwest and crosses over part of the Richard B. Russell Lake on the W.D. Nixon Bridge. Then, SC 81 enters Lowndesville, where it curves to a northwesterly routing east of Providence Cemetery. It curves to the north and crosses Charlies Creek. Just before intersecting Burdette Road, the highway enters Anderson County.

SC 81 heads to the north and enters Iva. At Hamilton Street, it intersects SC 184 which begins a concurrency through town. They intersect the western terminus of SC 413. Here SC 184 and SC 413 travel to the southeast on East Green Street. SC 81 leaves town and curves to the northwest. The highway begins curving to the north-northeast and passes Crescent High School. It heads to the north-northwest and enters Starr. There, it intersects the eastern terminus of SC 412 (Stones Throw Avenue). Then, it travels to the north-northeast and back to the north-northwest before it enters Homeland Park. The highway curves again to the north-northeast and passes Homeland Park Elementary School. Then, it intersects U.S. Route 29 (US 29; West Shockley Ferry Road). The two highways begin a short concurrency. One block later, they intersect SC 28 (Pearman Dairy Road). One block after that, US 29 splits off to the northeast. SC 81 heads in a fairly northerly direction and passes Orr Mill Park just before entering Anderson. At Sayre Street, US 29 Business (US 29 Bus.) comes from the west and begins traveling concurrent with SC 81. At the same intersection, SC 28 Bus. comes from the east and joins them. The three highway travel to the north and intersect US 76/US 178, which also joins the concurrency. The five-highway concurrency intersects the eastern terminus of SC 24 (Whitner Street). At Greenville Street, US 29 Bus./SC 28 Bus./SC 81 turns to the right for one block, where SC 28 Bus. turns left onto Main Street. US 29 Bus. and SC 81 pass AnMed Health Medical Center and then split at a point west of Anderson University. SC 81 heads northeast and passes Cater Lake Park. It then crosses over Cox Creek and then passes McCants Middle School. It leaves Anderson and passes Oaklawn Cemetery. The highway then passes T. L. Hanna High School. Then, it has an interchange with Interstate 85 (I-85). It turns left onto SC 8 (Easley Highway). The two highways travel concurrently to the north-northwest. When they split, SC 81 resumes its northeasterly direction. It passes by Wren Elementary School, Wren Middle School, and Wren High School. The highway intersects SC 86. It has a short easterly segment before curving back to the northeast. It crosses over Big Brushy Creek and enters Powdersville. It passes Pleasant View Cemetery and passes Concrete Primary School. Immediately after crossing over Craven Creek, it intersects SC 153. The highway passes Dolly Cooper Park. When, it crosses over the Saluda River, not only does it leave Powdersville, it enters Greenville County.

SC 81 starts off traveling along the southeastern edge of Welcome. It passes Carolina High School and Academy just before it intersects US 25 (White Horse Road). It travels under a railroad bridge, where it begins traveling along the Dunean-Judson line. Then, it enters Greenville for about eight blocks. At Vardry Street, SC 81 ends, and Anderson Street continues to the northeast for one block.

History

South Carolina Highway 82

South Carolina Highway 82 (SC 82) was a state highway that was established in 1928 on a path from SC 20 (now SC 28 just east-southeast of Lethia (and northwest of McCormick) to SC 81 in Starr. It traveled through Mount Carmel, Calhoun Falls, and Lowndesville. In 1949, it was decommissioned; most of its path was redesignated as SC 81.

Lethia alternate route

South Carolina Highway 82 Alternate (SC 82 Alt.) was an alternate route that was established in 1940 from SC 82 (now SC 81) in Lethia north-northeast to SC 28 north-northeast of Lethia. In 1947, it was decommissioned and downgraded to a secondary road. Today, its path is known as Richey Road.

Major intersections

See also

References

External links

 
 Mapmikey's South Carolina Highways Page: SC 81
 Mapmikey's South Carolina Highways Page: Former SC 82
 Mapmikey's South Carolina Highways Page: Former SC 82 Alternate

081
Transportation in McCormick County, South Carolina
Transportation in Abbeville County, South Carolina
Transportation in Anderson County, South Carolina
Transportation in Greenville County, South Carolina
Transportation in Greenville, South Carolina